Luis Gonzalez (born September 24, 1989 in Long Beach, California) is an American soccer player who last played for Los Angeles Blues in USL Professional Division.

Career
Gonzalez played college soccer at Cerritos College between 2008 and 2009, before transferring to Cal Poly Pomona for the 2010 and 2011 seasons. Gonzalez was a two-time NCAA Division II All-American while with the Broncos and made the All-CCAA First Team both seasons. In 2011, he took home the CCAA Most Valuable Offensive Player of the Year award. The California-native totaled 26 goals and 14 assists during his time at Cal Poly Pomona. In addition, he had five goals and four assists for USL PDL outfit Thunder Bay Chill in 2010 and 2011, helping the Canadian side to the Heartland and Central Conference title last season.

Gonzalez signed his first professional contract with USL Professional Division club Los Angeles Blues on January 19, 2012.

References

External links
 CPP profile

1989 births
Living people
American soccer players
Thunder Bay Chill players
Orange County SC players
USL League Two players
USL Championship players
Association football forwards